Puerto Rico Highway 168 (PR-168) is a road located in Bayamón, Puerto Rico. This highway extends from PR-2 in Hato Tejas to the Puerto Rico National Cemetery.

Major intersections

See also

 List of highways numbered 168

References

External links
 

168
Bayamón, Puerto Rico